Elphin may refer to:

Places

Canada
 Elphin, Ontario, a hamlet in North Sherbrooke, Lanark County

Ireland
 Elphin, County Roscommon, Ireland 
 Diocese of Elphin, a diocese in Ireland
 Roman Catholic Diocese of Elphin

Scotland
 Elphin, Highland, a village in Highland council area

People
 Saint Elphin, after whom is named:
 St Elphin's Church, Warrington
 St Elphin's School, a former boarding school in Derbyshire

See also
Elffin ap Gwyddno, a character in Welsh mythology
Elfin (disambiguation)